Horvat is a surname of Croatian origin. It is the most frequent surname in Croatia and the second most frequent in Slovenia. Its variant Horvath is very frequent in Hungary and Slovakia.

The surname originates in Croatia, Horvat being the older version of the word Hrvat, an autonym used by Croats.

In the 2011 census, it was the most common last name in the City of Zagreb, Zagreb County, Krapina-Zagorje County, Varaždin County, Koprivnica-Križevci County, Bjelovar-Bilogora County, and Virovitica-Podravina County.

In Croatia, majority of Croats with surname Horvat live in the Kajkavian dialect region in Croatia proper. Apart from them, there is a certain number of ethnic Serbs with surname Horvat in the Baranja region of Croatia.

In Slovenia, almost half of the citizens with the surname Horvat live in the Prekmurje region, where it is the most common surname by far. It is also common in Lower Styria and in Ljubljana, while it is very rare in western Slovenia.

People 
Andraš Horvat (1744–1789), Croatian author and cultural activist who worked among the Hungarian Slovenes
Bo Horvat (1995), Canadian ice hockey player
Branko Horvat (1928–2003), Croatian economist and politician
Danielle Horvat (1991), Australian actress
Darko Horvat (1973), Croatian footballer
Drago Horvat (1958), Yugoslav ice hockey player
Dmitry Horvat (1858–1937), Russian lieutenant general
Feri Horvat (1941–2020), Slovenian politician
Frank Horvat (1928–2020), Italian photographer
Hrvoje Horvat (1946), Croatian handball player and coach
Hrvoje Horvat, Jr. (1977), Croatian handball player and coach
Ivan Horvat (1993), Croatian pole vaulter
Ivica Horvat (1926–2012), Croatian footballer
John Horvat (died 1394), Croatian nobleman
Josip Horvat Međimurec (1904–1945), Croatian painter
Jovan Horvat (1722–1786), Russian general
Joža Horvat (1915–2012), Croatian writer and sailor
Lidija Horvat (1982), Croatian handball player
Lidija Horvat-Dunjko (1967), Croatian soprano
Lucas Mario Horvat (1985), Slovenian footballer
Nikolina Horvat (1986), Croatian athlete
Mila Horvat (1981), Croatian TV host
Milan Horvat (1919–2014), Croatian conductor
Paul Horvat (14th century), bishop of Zagreb
Ryan Horvat (1993), Canadian ice hockey player
Srećko Horvat (1983), Croatian-born philosopher
Stevan Horvat (1932–2018), Serbian wrestler
Steve Horvat (1971), Australian professional football player
Stjepan Horvat (1895–1985), Croatian geodesist and professor
Zlatko Horvat (1984), Croatian handball player

See also
 
Horváth
Hrovat
Charvat

References 

Croatian surnames
Hungarian-language surnames
Slovene-language surnames
Ethnonymic surnames